Avena brevis, the short oat, is a species of grass in the family Poaceae whose seeds are edible.

Synonyms 
There are a number of synonyms:

 Avena uniflora Parl.      
 Avena sativa var. brevis (Roth) Körn. 
 Avena strigosa var. abbreviata Hausskn. 
 Avena strigosa var. brevis (Roth) Hausskn. 
 Avena strigosa subsp. brevis (Roth) Husnot
 Avena sativa subsp. brevis (Roth) Asch. & Graebn., Syn. mitteleur. 
 Avena strigosa subsp. strigosa prol. brevis (Roth) Thell.   
 Avena sativa subsp. sativa var. brevis (Roth) Fiori
 Avena nuda subsp. brevis (Roth) Mansf.

References

External links

Clayton, W.D., Harman, K.T. and Williamson, H. (2002 onwards). World Grass Species: Descriptions, Identification, and Information Retrieval.: Avena brevis
 GrainGenes Species Report: Avena brevis
 Mansfeld's Encyclopedia of Agricultural and Horticultural Crops' (P. Hanelt & IPK (eds.) 2001, Springer: Avena brevis
Plants For A Future: Avena brevis

brevis
Plants described in 1787